Song of Granite is a 2017 Irish biographical drama film directed by Pat Collins. It was selected as the Irish entry for the Best Foreign Language Film at the 90th Academy Awards, but it was not nominated.

Plot
The origins and rise of sean-nós singer Joe Heaney are charted.

Cast
 Colm Seoighe as Joe 1
 Mícheál Ó Confhaola as Joe 2
 Macdara Ó Fátharta as Joe 3
 Leni Parker as Mrs. Rosenblatt
 Alain Goulem as Alan Lomax
 Jaren Cerf as Rosie

See also
 List of submissions to the 90th Academy Awards for Best Foreign Language Film
 List of Irish submissions for the Academy Award for Best Foreign Language Film

References

External links
 

2017 films
2017 drama films
2017 biographical drama films
Irish biographical drama films
Irish-language films
Irish black-and-white films
Biographical films about musicians
Cultural depictions of Irish men
Cultural depictions of folk musicians
English-language Irish films
English-language Canadian films
2010s Canadian films
Canadian biographical drama films